An island of inversion is a region of the chart of nuclides where isotopes have enhanced stability in a sea of mostly fleeting and unstable nuclei at the edge of the nuclear map. Each island contains isotopes with a non-standard ordering of single particle levels in the nuclear shell model. Such an area was first described in 1975 by French physicists carrying out spectroscopic mass measurements of exotic isotopes of lithium and sodium. Since then further studies have shown that five such regions exist within the known table of nuclides. These are centered at neutron-rich isotopes of five elements, namely 11Li, 20C, 31Na, 42Si, and 64Cr. Because there are five known islands of inversion, physicists have suggested renaming the phenomenon as an "archipelago of islands of shell breaking". Studies with the purpose of defining the edges of this region are still ongoing.

See also
 Table of nuclides
 Periodic table and Periodic table (extended)
 Island of stability

References

External links
 Abstract and references for the original paper
 Article on archipelago of shell-breaking with map of nuclide table showing the 5 known islands
 From Physical Review Letters: New neutron-rich nuclei support "island of inversion" theory at the National Superconducting Cyclotron Laboratory website

Nuclear physics